Dhaka City College also known as DCC, is one of the oldest private college in the country of Bangladesh. It is located at Qudrat-i-Khuda road, Dhanmondi, Dhaka. It offers  Honors and Masters degree programs as well as higher secondary education (HSC). The college is affiliated with the National University of Bangladesh.

Md. Anwar Hossain has been the college principal .  the chief of the college's governing body is Syed Modasser Ali, an alumnus of the college.

History
The college was established in 1957, during the Pakistani ruling period, with the patronage of local educators and social workers. Classes were held at the West End High School and afterwards at Dhaka College. In 1970, college activities were moved to their own premises in Road 2 of the Dhanmondi residential area. Prior to this, it was known as "Dhaka Night College".

Khan Bahadur Abdur Rahman and Ataur Rahman Khan, both former prime ministers of Bangladesh, contributed significantly to the college's establishment. Khaney Alom Khan, former chairman of the college's governing body, arranged financial assistance for the development of the academic buildings while he was the divisional commissioner of Dhaka Division.

Academics

Degrees 
One of the colleges of Dhaka Education Board, Dhaka City College provides education in Science, Business Studies and Humanities in the Higher Secondary School Certificate. Besides, this college affiliated to the National University, Bangladesh has arrangements undergraduate and graduate programs.

Departments 
There are total of 21 departments in this college. Every department is decorated by one coordinator and well qualified and skilled teachers.

Notable alumni

 Agun, singer-songwriter and Bachsas Awards winning actor.
 Bassbaba Sumon, vocalist, bassist, and founding member of Bangladeshi rock band Aurthohin.
 Mahiya Mahi, an actress in the Bangladeshi film industry.
 Maria Nur Rowshon, television presenter, radio personality, and winner of Babisas Award for modelling.
 Nishat Majumdar, first Bangladeshi female to scale Mount Everest.
 Sayeed Khokon, politician and mayor of Dhaka.
 Shahriar Alam, state deputy-minister of foreign affairs, The People's Republic of Bangladesh.
 Syed Modasser Ali, renowned ophthalmic surgeon and executive board member of World Health Organisation (WHO).

See also
 Dhaka Imperial College
 Dhaka Commerce College
 Dhaka College
 Comilla Victoria College
 Rajshahi College

References

Dhanmondi
Colleges affiliated to National University, Bangladesh
Colleges in Dhaka District
Universities and colleges in Dhaka
1957 establishments in East Pakistan
Educational institutions established in 1957
Dhaka City College